Martina de la Puente Piñera  (born 4 April 1975 in Gijón, Asturias) is a retired female shot putter from Spain. She set her personal best of 18.17 metres in 1999 in Jerez de la Frontera.

Achievements

External links

1975 births
Living people
Spanish female shot putters
Athletes (track and field) at the 2000 Summer Olympics
Olympic athletes of Spain
Sportspeople from Gijón
Mediterranean Games bronze medalists for Spain
Mediterranean Games medalists in athletics
Athletes (track and field) at the 1997 Mediterranean Games
Athletes (track and field) at the 2001 Mediterranean Games
Athletes (track and field) at the 2005 Mediterranean Games
Competitors at the 1995 Summer Universiade
Competitors at the 1997 Summer Universiade
Competitors at the 1999 Summer Universiade
Competitors at the 2001 Summer Universiade